The women's tournament of Water polo at the 2018 Asian Games at Jakarta, Indonesia, began on 16 August and ended on 21 August 2018. All games were held at the Gelora Bung Karno Aquatic Stadium.

After the cancelation of the 2020 Asian Water Polo Championships, the Asian Games acted as the Asian qualifying tournament for the 2020 Olympic Games in Tokyo.

Squads

Results
All times are Western Indonesia Time (UTC+07:00)

Final standing

References

External links
Official Result Book – Water Polo

Women